Zitko is a surname. Notable people with the surname include:

 Matic Žitko (born 1990), Slovenian footballer
 Otto Zitko (born 1959), Austrian artist
 Radim Žitko (born 1978), Czech tennis player